Ameerudeen Mohaideen (born 1 May 1992) is an Indian professional footballer who plays as a forward for I-League club Chennai City.

Club career

Early life
Born in Thanjavur, Tamil Nadu, Mohaideen first participated in the Chennai Football Association Senior Division with Sport Authority of India. In 2012, Mohaideen was selected for the Tamil Nadu side that would participate in the 2011–12 edition of the Santosh Trophy. He was selected for this second Santosh Trophy for the 2013–14 edition. His coach while playing with Tamil Nadu was his former Sport Authority of India coach M. Narayanamoorthy. On 3 February 2014, Mohaideen scored for Tamil Nadu against Andhra Pradesh during the qualifiers.

The next season, Mohaideen was selected to the Tamil Nadu squad for the 2014–15 Santosh Trophy. He was then part of the squad the next edition. In 2015, Mohaideen was playing with Income Tax.

Chennai City
Prior to the 2018–19 season, Mohaideen joined local I-League club Chennai City. He made his debut for the club on 4 November 2018 against Gokulam Kerala. He came on as a 42nd minute substitute and scored the club's third goal in the 68th minute as Chennai City won 3–2.

Success came at the end of the season for Mohaideen as Chennai City won the I-League title.

Career statistics

Honours
Chennai City
I-League: 2018–19

References

External links
 Profile at the All India Football Federation

1992 births
Living people
Sportspeople from Tamil Nadu
Indian footballers
Association football forwards
Tamil Nadu footballers
Chennai City FC players
Santosh Trophy players
I-League players
Footballers from Tamil Nadu